Zaklodzie or Zakłodzie may refer to:
Zakłodzie, West Pomeranian Voivodeship
Zakłodzie, Lublin Voivodeship
Zakłodzie meteorite